ISO 3166-2:TT is the entry for Trinidad and Tobago in ISO 3166-2, part of the ISO 3166 standard published by the International Organization for Standardization (ISO), which defines codes for the names of the principal subdivisions (e.g., provinces or states) of all countries coded in ISO 3166-1.

Currently for Trinidad and Tobago, ISO 3166-2 codes are defined for 9 regions, 3 boroughs, 2 cities, and 1 ward.

Each code consists of two parts, separated by a hyphen. The second part is three letters.

Current codes
Subdivision names are listed as in the ISO 3166-2 standard published by the ISO 3166 Maintenance Agency (ISO 3166/MA).

Click on the button in the header to sort each column.

Changes
The following changes to the entry are listed on ISO's online catalogue, the Online Browsing Platform:

See also
 Subdivisions of Trinidad and Tobago
 FIPS region codes of Trinidad and Tobago

External links
 ISO Online Browsing Platform: TT
 Regions of Trinidad and Tobago, Statoids.com

2:TT
ISO 3166-2
Trinidad and Tobago geography-related lists